Johnny Lester III (born February 6, 1988) is an American football wide receiver who is currently a free agent. He played college football at Minot State University.

Early life
Lester attended Miami Southridge High School, in Miami, Florida, where he was a participant in both track and field and football.

College career
Lester signed to play college football and run track at Minot State University. As a freshman in 2006, Lester was redshirted. As a four-year starter he collected 23 receiving, 12 special team, and 2 rushing touchdowns. He holds the conference record for kick return touchdowns in a single season, and school record for 100 meter dash. Lester became a four time All-Conference player, senior All-American, and won the conference Most Valuable Player Award during his time at Minot.

Professional career

Albany Panthers
In 2013, Lester began his professional career signing with the Albany Panthers of the Professional Indoor Football League.

Georgia Fire
In 2014, Lester joined the Georgia Fire after the Panthers folded prior to the start of the season.

New Orleans VooDoo
In April 2015, Lester signed with the New Orleans VooDoo of the Arena Football League. Lester hauled in 26 receptions as a rookie for the VooDoo. When the VooDoo ceased operations on August 9, 2015, Lester became a free agent.

References
http://www.dakstats.com/WebSync/Pages/Team/IndividualStats.aspx?association=10&sg=MFB&sea=NAIMFB_2009&team=2250&plr=32743&tab=2

http://www.msubeavers.com/news/2010/8/8/TRACK_0808103027.aspx

External links
Minot State bio
Arena Football bio

Living people
1988 births
American football wide receivers
Minot State Beavers football players
Albany Panthers players
Georgia Fire players
New Orleans VooDoo players
Players of American football from Miami
Miami Southridge Senior High School alumni